The Homes on Wheels Alliance (or HOWA) is a 501(c)(3) nonprofit organization that helps seniors, the working poor, and others dealing with homelessness to use vehicles such as vans and buses as homes. The organization's president, Bob Wells, a self-described nomad, came up with the idea several years after creating a web site about van-dwelling. Based in Pahrump, Nevada, west of Las Vegas, the organization was formed in October 2018 to help American nomads already living in wheeled vehicles. After incorporation as a nonprofit later that year, the Homes on Wheels Alliance began training volunteers to repair or improve homes on wheels. It sought donations, and it established an emergency fund for "nomads in need".

According to the organization's executive director, Suanne Carlson, people seeking help from the alliance must apply and must provide information about their financial status, their ability to maintain their vehicle, and their preparation for what is essentially full-time camping. Between 2019 and 2021, the alliance awarded 16 homes on wheels to nomads and distributed solar panels and electric bicycles donated by alliance partners. The group intends to expand nationwide since homelessness is a national problem, Wells said.

References

501(c)(3) organizations
Non-profit organizations based in Nevada